"Catfish John" is a song written by Bob McDill and Allen Reynolds first released on McDill's album Short Stories, and subsequently recorded and released by American country music artist Johnny Russell. It was released in November 1972 as the fourth single from the album, "Catfish John"/"Chained".  The song is credited with propelling Bob McDill into the front ranks of country songwriters.

The song has also been performed by Jerry Garcia (Jerry Garcia Band, Old & In the Way), as well as other musicians. Toots Hibbert recorded the song on Fire on the Mountain: Reggae Celebrates the Grateful Dead (Pow Wow), a Grateful Dead tribute album. It has also been performed and recorded by Alison Krauss and Nitty Gritty Dirt Band.

Content 
The song is a story about a former slave, which emphasizes difficulties of the everyday life for Black people at the time, and about the singer who, in boyhood, found him an inspiration and source of Delta culture.

Chart performance

References

1972 singles
Johnny Russell (singer) songs
Songs written by Bob McDill
Songs written by Allen Reynolds
Grateful Dead songs
RCA Records singles
1972 songs